Filippo Fedeli (born 27 January 1983) is an Italian professional footballer.

He played 2 games in the Serie A in the 2001/02 season for ACF Fiorentina. He also played for Fiorentina in the 2001–02 UEFA Cup.

In January 2007 Fedeli joined Empoli. He was immediately left for Olbia. On 31 August 2007 he joined Ternana. On 8 January 2009 Fedeli returned to Olbia.

References

External links
 
 Lega Serie A profile 

1983 births
Living people
Italian footballers
Serie A players
ACF Fiorentina players
A.S. Gualdo Casacastalda players
S.P.A.L. players
Pisa S.C. players
Olbia Calcio 1905 players
Ternana Calcio players
Pol. Monterotondo Lupa players
Association football defenders
Sportspeople from Arezzo
Footballers from Tuscany